The 1962–63 Cupa României was the 25th edition of Romania's most prestigious football cup competition.

The title was won by Petrolul Ploiești against Siderurgistul Galați.

Format
The competition is an annual knockout tournament.

In the first round proper, two pots were made, first pot with Divizia A teams and other teams till 16 and the second pot with the rest of teams qualified in this phase. Each tie is played as a single leg.

First round proper matches are played on the ground of the lowest ranked team, then from the second round proper the matches are played on a neutral location.

In the first round proper, if a match is drawn after 90 minutes, the game goes in extra time, and if the scored is still tight after 120 minutes, the team who played away will qualify.

From the second round proper, if a match is drawn after 90 minutes, the game goes in extra time, and if the scored is still tight after 120 minutes, then a replay will be played. In case the game is still tight after the replay, then the team from lower division will qualify for the next round.

From the first edition, the teams from Divizia A entered in competition in sixteen finals, rule which remained till today.

First round proper

|colspan=3 style="background-color:#FFCCCC;"|10 April 1963

|}

Second round proper

|colspan=3 style="background-color:#FFCCCC;"|15 May 1963

|-
|colspan=3 style="background-color:#FFCCCC;"|27 June 1963

|}

Quarter-finals 

|colspan=3 style="background-color:#FFCCCC;"|27 June 1963

|-
|colspan=3 style="background-color:#FFCCCC;"|4 July 1963

|-
|colspan=3 style="background-color:#FFCCCC;"|28 June 1963 — Replay

|}
Notes:
  Siderurgistul Galați qualified in semi-finals being the younger team (24,9 years) compared with Progresul București (26,6 years).

Semi-finals

|colspan=3 style="background-color:#FFCCCC;"|10 July 1963

|-
|colspan=3 style="background-color:#FFCCCC;"|11 July 1963 — Replay

|}

Final

References

External links
 romaniansoccer.ro
 Official site
 The Romanian Cup on the FRF's official site

Cupa României seasons
1962–63 in Romanian football
Romania